The Long Live the Angels Tour is the second concert tour by Scottish singer Emeli Sandé. Sandé announced in November 2016 that she would embark on a European and United States tour, starting in the following March in support of her second album, Long Live the Angels. The tour consists of 40 shows, including Sandé's first arena shows, which were announced in December 2016.

Calum Scott was the opening act during the October 2017 arena leg of the tour.

Controversy
Several complaints were received by Ticketmaster and Genting Arena following Sande's Birmingham gig on 25 October. The show was cut considerably short, only lasting one-hour compared to the near two-hour set at all other UK dates. The tour organisers refused to provide any refunds, and Sande herself did not comment, though it is believed vocal strain led to the incident. The original full set list was restored for the final tour date on 27 October.

Setlist
This setlist is from the show on 15 October 2017 in Glasgow. It does not represent all shows for the tour.

"Hurts"
"Free"
"Where I Sleep"
"Growth" 
"Lonely"
"Give Me Something"
"Every Single Little Piece"
"Journey" 
"Kung Fu" 
"My Kind of Love"
"Breathing Underwater"
"Happen"
"Rebellion" 
"Heaven"
"Piece of My Heart"
"Clown"
"River"
"Suitcase"
"Starlight" 
"Beneath Your Beautiful"
"Read All About It, Pt. III"
"Wonder"
"Babe"
"Highs & Lows"
"Next to Me"
Encore
"Little Bit Longer"

Shows

References

2017 concert tours